Santa Coloma is a Barcelona Metro station in Santa Coloma de Gramenet, a municipality of the metropolitan area of Barcelona. It's served by L1 (red line). It opened in 1983 and is located under Passeig Llorenç Serra.

Services

See also
List of Barcelona Metro stations

External links

Trenscat.com

Railway stations in Spain opened in 1983
Barcelona Metro line 1 stations
Transport in Santa Coloma de Gramenet